Gayathrie Shankar is an Indian actress who appears in Tamil and Malayalam films. Her Tamil film debut was in 2012 with 18 Vayasu, and is best known for her role in Naduvula Konjam Pakkatha Kaanom (2012). She had her Malayalam film debut with Nna Thaan Case Kodu (2022).

Early life 
Gayathrie was born and brought up in Bangalore.

Career 

The actress's first release was the psychological thriller 18 Vayasu, but was recognized for her work in Naduvula Konjam Pakkatha Kaanom alongside Vijay Sethupathi. In 2013 she starred in two films, Ponmaalai Pozhudhu and Mathapoo. She was next seen in Rummy, a 1980s college love story, opposite Inigo Prabhakaran.

The multi-starrer Ula, was renamed Chithiram Pesuthuadi 2 and saw a release in 2019. The movie is directed by Rajan Madhav of Muran fame, also starred Radhika Apte, Priya Banerjee, Vidharth and Dwayne Bravo. Puriyatha Puthir directed by Ranjit Jeyakodi co-starring with Vijay Sethupathi, released in 2017. Oru Nalla Naal Paathu Solren directed by debutant Arumugakumar was a dark comedy starring Vijay Sethupathi, Gautham Karthik and Niharika Konidela. The movie released on 2 February 2018. Seethakathi released on 20 December 2018. She worked as an assistant director on Seethakathi, directed by Balaji Tharaneetharan. She also featured in a cameo in Seethakathi. 2018 also saw her foraying into web series. She played Aadhira, in the Amazon Prime exclusive series called Vella Raja.

2019 saw the release of the much awaited Super Deluxe, directed by Thiagarajan Kumararaja, starring Vijay Sethupathi, Samantha Akkineni, Fahadh Faasil, Ramya Krishnan, Mysskin among others.

In 2022, she starred in Lokesh Kanagaraj's Vikram, in which she played the wife of Amar, interpreted by Fahadh Faasil along Kamal Haasan and Vijay Sethupathi . The film marks her second collaboration with Faasil after Super Deluxe and eighth collaboration with Vijay Sethupathi. Her long delayed movie, Maamanithan, directed by Seenu Ramasamy with Vijay Sethupathi was released in the same year.

Filmography

Films 
All films are in Tamil, unless otherwise noted.

Web series

References

External links 
 
 

Living people
Actresses from Bangalore
Actresses in Tamil cinema
Actresses in Malayalam cinema
21st-century Indian actresses
Tamil actresses
Indian film actresses
Place of birth missing (living people)